Garrett "GMAC" McNamara (born August 10, 1967) is an American  professional big wave surfer best  known for setting the world record for largest wave ever surfed, as documented in the HBO series 100 Foot Wave. 
McNamara is also known for successfully negotiating a monstrous barrel at Jaws, and being the first person ever to ride a wave formed from calving glaciers.

Early life and education
McNamara was born on August 10, 1967, in Pittsfield, Massachusetts, and spent much of his childhood in Berkeley, California. McNamara has Irish ancestry. In Berkeley, McNamara, and his younger brother Liam, were both known by friends to be rather fearless and to shrug off the pains of rough childhood play, foreshadowing his later ability to face danger while surfing. During his early childhood, his mother took the family to Central America, where she was a victim of domestic abuse and occasionally abandoned him and his brother; at one point, a Guatemalan farmer sought to adopt him, but his mother returned and brought the family back to America. He then returned to Berkeley, where his mother left him with his birth father; McNamara lived with him for several years until his mother returned with a new domestic partner, who moved the family to the North Shore of Hawaii in 1978. At eleven years old, McNamara followed his younger brother's footsteps and began surfing at Sunset, Waimea and the outer reefs in search of giant swells. He entered and placed in the prestigious Triple Crown of Surfing series at age seventeen and began to gain  sponsors. For the next ten years, both brothers joined the competition circuit. For several years, his brother Liam was more well-known in the surfing community. 

Tow surfing caught on among the surfing community in the early 1990s and McNamara was one of the first to join the movement.  Boats and personal water craft enabled surfers to chase down and catch giant waves that were thought impossible, beyond the bounds of surfers paddling with their bare hands. McNamara welcomed and craved the challenge to find the biggest waves in the world, which   became his dream and mission in life.

Career

After training for a year, McNamara and tow-in partner Rodrigo Resende won the $70,000 purse at the Tow Surfing World Cup in Maui at Jaws in 2002.  Later that year, he posed for the cover of major surf magazines around the world after being photographed in a dramatic barrel shot off of the coast of Teahupo'o in Tahiti. In 2003 he rode one of his most well known waves. McNamara was once again at Jaws and caught a wave with a  barrel where onlookers believed he had been crushed by the lip of the wave. The wave spit and, escaping death, he emerged to the surprise and amazement of everyone watching, including himself.

The boundaries of big-wave surfing were pushed once again in the summer of 2007 by McNamara and partner Keali’i Mamala, seeking tsunami formed by  calving glaciers in South-Central Alaska. A feature film was made documenting their experience.

In January 2016, McNamara suffered a severe wipeout on a 50-foot wave at Mavericks in California that caused him to skip off the water three times before being swallowed by the monster-size wave. Rescuers on jet skis eventually pulled McNamara to safety, and he suffered a dislocated shoulder and a broken upper arm that required surgery. Video of McNamara's wipeout went viral, and local surfers have said it was one of the worst wipeouts caught on video.

World record

In November 2011, chasing storms and tracking swells paid off for McNamara as he entered the Guinness World Records. He caught a  wave in Praia do Norte, Nazaré, Portugal, after being towed into the wave from a jet ski riding a 6’0 Dick Brewer Tow Board. His record beat the prior world record by over a foot, but the premature announcement (by others, not by McNamara) proved a source of controversy in the surf world. Meanwhile, McNamara continued to search for an even larger wave.

In January 2013, McNamara broke his own world record by surfing an estimated  wave. He also did this off the coast of Nazaré.

Beyond surfing
McNamara became interested in Stand Up Paddle (SUP) and gave it his own twist by designing and creating SUP boards for a more extreme experience, venturing into big wave venues like Waimea, Puerto Escondido, and Mavericks. He was invited to compete in the World Stand Up Paddle Surfing Championship in June 2009 by the International Surfing Association, where only 32 elite surfers were invited to attend.

Personal life
McNamara is married to Nicole McNamara (née Macias), an environmental sciences teacher. When they first met, both were married to other people. The couple wed at Praia do Norte, Nazaré, Portugal, in November 2012. They have three children, Barrel (2015), Theia Love Nazaré Celeste Rose (2018) and Fe do Mar Strawberry Lucy (2021). He has three children from his previous marriage to Konnie Pascual McNamara:  Ariana Kaimana McNamara (1995), Titus Waimea McNamara (1997), and Tiari McNamara.

Awards and honors
Portuguese Navy  Medalha Naval de Vasco da Gama
2012 Entered into Guinness World Records for Largest Wave Ever Surfed of 78 feet - Nazaré, Portugal
2012 Billabong XXL Awards – Biggest Wave Award
2012 Billabong XXL Awards – Wipeout of the Year Award
2008 2nd Place Puerto Escondido, Mexico SUP Contest
2008 Billabong XXL Awards – Performance of the Year Award
2008 2nd Place Free Wave Challenge Tube of the Year
2007 Billabong XXL Awards – Performance of the Year
2007 Billabong XXL Awards – Biggest Wave Award
2006 1st Place Nell Scott Tow Surfing Championships
2006 Billabong XXL Awards – Golden Donut Award
2005 1st Place North Shore Tow Surfing Championships
2004 Surfer Poll – Best Tube Award
2003 1st Place Jaws World Cup Expression Session
2002 1st Place Jaws World Cup Tow in Surfing

Filmography
The following is based on Internet Movie Database data:

Television 
Fuel TV - 12 episodes
Travel Channel - 12 episodes
Anderson Cooper 360° Segment
Discovery Channel Segment
The Swell Life OWN - 12 episodes
100 Foot Wave - 6 episodes

Films 
The Glacier Project
The North Canyon Show by Garrett McNamara
100 Foot Wave

See also 
 Gabe Davies
Richie Fitzgerald
Laird Hamilton
Dave Kalama
Keala Kennelly
Mark Mathews

References

External links 

 

American surfers
Tow-in surfers
Big wave surfing
Sportspeople in Hawaii
1967 births
Living people
Sportspeople from Pittsfield, Massachusetts
People from Oahu